Live in 3⅔/4 Time is a live album by trumpeter Don Ellis recorded in 1966 at the Pacific Jazz Festival and Shelly's Manne-Hole in 1967 and  released on the Pacific Jazz label. The title comes from the composition "Upstart", which is in  time with a 3+3+3+2 feel, cheekily referred to as  time.

Reception

The Allmusic site awarded the album  stars stating "The Don Ellis Orchestra really came into its own during the period covered by this CD (1966–1967), playing perfectly coherent solos in ridiculous time signatures... Fun music". The Penguin Guide to Jazz called it "entertaining and provocative".

Track listing 
All compositions by Don Ellis except as indicated

 
Bonus tracks on CD reissue
 "Bossa Nueva Nova" (Levy) – 5:30  
 "Opus Five" (Howlett Smith) – 9:53   
 "Seven Up" (Smith) – 4:39
 "One Note" (Jaki Byard) – 2:24  
 "Freedom Jazz Dance" [alternative version] (Harris) – 7:39
Recorded at The Pacific Jazz Festival in Costa Mesa, California on October 8, 1966 (tracks 1–3) and at Shelly's Manne-Hole in Los Angeles, California on March 27, 1967 (tracks 4–11). (The CD liner notes incorrectly give the date of the Pacific Jazz Festival performance as October 10.)

Personnel 
Don Ellis – trumpet, arranger
Alan Weight, Ed Warren, Glenn Stuart, Bob Harmon – trumpet
Ron Myers (tracks 1–3), Dave Wells, Dave Sanchez (tracks 4–11) – trombone
Terry Woodson – bass trombone 
Ruben Leon – alto saxophone, soprano saxophone, flute
Tom Scott – alto saxophone, saxello, flute (tracks 1–3)
Joe Roccisano – alto saxophone, soprano saxophone, flute, clarinet (tracks 4–11)
Ira Shulman, Ron Starr – tenor saxophone, flute, clarinet
John Magruder – baritone saxophone, flute, clarinet, bass clarinet 
David MacKay – piano 
Frank DeLaRosa, Chuck Domanico (tracks 1–3), Ray Neapolitan, Dave Parlato (tracks 4–11) – bass 
Alan Estes – drums, timbales
Steve Bohannon – drums 
Chino Valdes – bongos, congas 
Mark Stevens – percussion (tracks 1–3)

References 

Don Ellis live albums
1967 live albums
Pacific Jazz Records live albums
Albums recorded at Shelly's Manne-Hole